The 6.5×25mm CBJ is a firearm cartridge designed by CBJ Tech AB, a Swedish weapon development company based in Kungsbacka, for its CBJ-MS submachine gun/personal defence weapon.

Description
Named after CBJ Tech AB's founder and president Carl Bertil Johansson, the 6.5×25mm CBJ has the same functional dimensions as the 9×19mm Parabellum and was designed to produce the same recoil and pressures to allow most 9 mm caliber weapons to be converted to 6.5×25mm CBJ with a simple barrel change. Also, because the 6.5×25mm CBJ has the same overall dimensions as the 9×19mm Parabellum, it can be used in the same magazines. The standard saboted tungsten ball, when fired from a 300 mm length barrel, can pierce  of armor plate and leave a 6 mm diameter entry hole. Against the same plate, both 5.56×45mm NATO SS109 and 7.62×51mm NATO M80 failed to penetrate. The 6.5×25mm CBJ brass-jacketed ball rounds are heavier than similar rounds in the FN 5.7×28mm and HK 4.6×30mm.
 
There are several other 6.5×25mm CBJ bullets other than the sabot in full-caliber. Military rounds include a "spoon-tip" loading that increases the chance of the bullet to cavitate on impact, and a cheap training version with a different core material. A subsonic armor-piercing round weighs  for use with a suppressor.

See also
List of cartridges by caliber
List of rifle cartridges
5.7×28mm
4.6×30mm
6 mm caliber

References

External links
 A new weapon system from Sweden

Pistol and rifle cartridges